Padena District is a district (bakhsh) in Semirom County, Isfahan Province, Iran. At the 2006 census, its population was 23,200, in 5,419 families.  The District has one city: Komeh. The District has three rural districts (dehestan): Padena-ye Olya Rural District, Padena-ye Sofla Rural District, and Padena-ye Vosta Rural District.

References 

Semirom County
Districts of Isfahan Province